The 2015 GPL Summer was the eighth edition of the Garena Premier League, a Riot Games-organised tournament for League of Legends, the multiplayer online battle arena video game. The 2015 GPL Summer  is a fully professional League of Legends league over all of the Southeast Asia region, with 16 teams from 5 countries/areas to determine which team is the best in the region.

Format
Group Stage #1
  16 teams divided into 4 groups of 4 (8 Seeded, 8 Unseeded)
  Double Round Robin, Each match is Best of Two.
 2:0 Winning team receives 3 points.
 1:1 Both teams receive 1 point.
  Top 2 teams from each group advance to Group Stage #2.
 All Ties Broken by Head-to-Head Record before the tie-breaker.
  Leading team in 4 group at GPL Spring 2015 after week 4 will be qualified to participate Taipei IEM play-off
Group Stage #2
  One group with 8 teams.
  Single Round Robin, Each match is Best of One.
  Top 4 teams advance to the Play-off.
 All ties broken by Head-to-Head Record before the tie-breaker.
Play-off
 Single-elimination bracket of 4 teams, Group Stage #2 #1 Seed vs. Group Stage #2 #4 Seed and Group Stage #2 #2 Seed vs. Group Stage #2 #3 Seed.
 Matches are best of five
 Top 2 teams qualify to SEA Finals

Qualifications

 Bangkok Titans has already qualified to SEA Finals. The spot will be replaced by the third place team.

Qualified teams 
6 teams from 5 countries/areas

Rosters

Results

Group stage
Group Stage #1  
 Group A

2nd Tiebreaker match 
 Thirsty Chinchillas  0−1  ZOTAC United 

 Group B

3rd Tiebreaker match 
 Wargods  0−1  Imperium Pro Team 

 Group C

 Group D

3rd Tiebreaker match 
 Go To Sleep  1−0  Mineski 

Group Stage #2
Double Round Robin. Top 4 teams advance to Knock-out stage.

Playoffs

Participants

 Boba Marines

 Full Louis

 Bangkok Titans

 Saigon Jokers

Results

Final standings

References

External links
 Official website

Sports leagues in Asia
League of Legends competitions